The Weller House, located at 524 Stewart Street in Fort Bragg, California, is a historic Victorian house that is operating as a bed & breakfast.

The oldest building in the city, it was built in 1886 for Horace Alanson Weller, Sr., a prominent figure in the early history of Fort Bragg who was manager of the Union Lumber Company Store then co-founder of the town's first bank. Expanded a year later, it came to include three stories with 10 rooms totaling , including a  ballroom.

It was listed on the National Register of Historic Places in 1976.  The listing included two contributing buildings and one other contributing structure.

References 

Houses on the National Register of Historic Places in California
National Register of Historic Places in Mendocino County, California
Houses completed in 1886
Victorian architecture in California
Houses in Mendocino County, California